I'm Hans Christian Andersen was released in 1994 by Australian children's musician, Franciscus Henri, via ABC Music's (ABC for Kids) on compact disc. It received an ARIA Music Award Nomination in 1995 for Best Children's Album.

Track listing
"I'm Hans Christian Andersen"
"The Ugly Duckling"
"Sunshine, Rainbows and Umbrellas" (F.Henri)
"An Old Tin Can" (F.Henri)
"Scarecrow" (F.Henri)
"Three Little Sparrows" (F.Henri)
"When the Train Comes Along"
"Piggy on the Railway"
"Bessie the Steam Train"
"Phone Call to Grandma" (F.Henri)
"Old People" (F.Henri)
"My Bag of Lollies" (F.Henri)
"The Green Eyed Dragon"
"Jellybean Street" (F.Henri)
"Lighthouse"
"Baby Beluga
"The Albatross Song" (Pacific Blue) (F.Henri)
"School Days" (F.Henri)
"Fishes Wishes" (F.Henri)
"Inch Worm"
"Thumbelina"
"Tick Tock" (F.Henri)
"Mummy Give Me a Drink of Water"

Video

Franciscus Henri sings I'm Hans Christian Andersen and other songs is a Franciscus Henri video that was released in 1994.

Songs
"Phone Call to Grandma"
"I'm Hans Christian Andersen"
"The Ugly Duckling"
"Four Rubbish Bins"
"My Bag of Lollies"
"The Little Red Car Song"
"Sea Dreams"
"Sailing"
"At the Bottom of the Sea"
"Three Jellyfish"
"Thumbelina"
"Mummy Give Me a Drink of Water"

Releases

VHS
 Australia: 26 September 1994

References

External links

1994 albums
Franciscus Henri albums
Children's music albums
Music based on works by Hans Christian Andersen
1994 video albums
Australian children's musical films